This is a list of settlements and places of interest in Devon, England.

A

B

C

D

E

F

G

H

I

J
Jacobstowe

K

L

M

N

O

P

Q
Queen's Nympton

R

S

T

U

V
Virginstow

W

Y

Z
Zeal Monachorum

Places of interest
Berry Head
Buckfast Abbey
Castles in Devon
Dartmoor
Exmoor
Heritage railways:
Babbacombe Cliff Railway
Bideford & Instow Railway
Dartmoor Railway
Lynton & Barnstaple Railway
Paignton & Dartmouth Steam Railway
Plym Valley Railway
South Devon Railway
Jurassic Coast (a World Heritage Site)
Lundy Island

See also
List of places in England

 
Devon
Places